The large moth family Crambidae contains the following genera beginning with "I":

References 

 I
Crambid